Autoimmune heart diseases are the effects of the body's own immune defense system mistaking cardiac antigens as foreign and attacking them leading to inflammation of the heart as a whole, or in parts. The commonest form of autoimmune heart disease is rheumatic heart disease or rheumatic fever.

Cause
Aetiologically, these are most commonly seen in children with a history of sore throat caused by a streptococcal infection. This is similar to the post-streptococcal glomerulonephritis. Here, the anti-bacterial antibodies cross react with the heart antigens causing inflammation.

Inflammatory damage leads to the following:
 Pericarditis: Here the pericardium gets inflamed. Acutely, it can cause pericardial effusion leading to cardiac tamponade and death. After healing, there may be fibrosis and adhesion of the pericardium with the heart leading to constriction of the heart and reduced cardiac function.
 Myocarditis: Here the muscle bulk of the heart gets inflamed. Inflamed muscles have reduced functional capacity. This may be fatal, if left untreated as is in a case of pancarditis. On healing, there will be fibrosis and reduced functional capacity.
 Endocarditis: Here the inner lining of the heart is inflamed, including the heart valves. This may cause a valve prolapse, adhesion of the adjacent cusps of these valves and occlusion of the flow tracts of blood through the heart causing diseases called valve stenosis.

Mechanism
These are the typical mechanisms of autoimmunity. Autoantibodies or auto-toxic T-lymphocyte mediated tissue destruction. The process is aided by neutrophils, the complement system, tumor necrosis factor alpha, etc.

Diagnosis

Types
These depend on the amount of inflammation. These are covered in their relevant articles.
 Acute: Heart failure; pericardial effusion; etc.
 Chronic: Valve diseases as noted above; Reduced cardiac output; Exercise intolerance.

Treatment
Intensive cardiac care and immunosuppressives including corticosteroids are helpful in the acute stage of the disease. Colchicine can also be used to help prevent recurrences in Pericarditis. Chronic phase has, mainly debility control and supportive care options.

See also
 Autoimmunity
 Heart
 Glomerulonephritis

References
 Harrison's Guide to Internal Medicine.
 Robin's Pathology. 

Immune system disorders
Heart diseases